The Bridgeport Barrage played their first season, as a charter member of the MLL, during the 2001 season of Major League Lacrosse.  The Barrage ended up in 3rd place in the American Division with a record of 3–11.  The Barrage failed to qualify for the 2001 season MLL playoffs.

Schedule

Major League Lacrosse seasons
Bridgeport Barrage
Bridgeport Barrage
Lacrosse in Connecticut